APLA Health is a non-profit organization that is focused on building health equity and promoting wellbeing for the LGBT and people living with HIV."

APLA Health is one of the largest non-profit HIV service organizations in the United States. Its activities include improving access to care; providing care; growing the number of people they serve; and partnering with other organizations.

The organization was founded as AIDS Project Los Angeles in 1983 by Max Drew, Nancy Cole Sawaya, Matt Redman and Erv Munro. On July 28, 1985, APLA held the world's first AIDS Walk, which brought in $673,000. In 2011, APLA opened a second 501(c)(3) organization, APLA Health & Wellness to provide HIV prevention services, economic development programs and social activities for gay and bisexual men and transgender individuals of color and began offering medical services in 2013. In 2016, AIDS Project Los Angeles and APLA Health & Wellness began doing business collectively as APLA Health.

Among the services provided by the organization are primary medical, dental and behavioral health care, housing, case management, nutritional health, treatment adherence, and home health. APLA Health operates eight Vance North Necessities of Life Program (NOLP) food pantry locations around Los Angeles and collaborates with five other organizations to provide food pantry services across the United States.

History
APLA Health was founded by Max Drew, Nancy Cole Sawaya, Matt Redman and Erv Munro. In December 1982, they held the first APLA Health fundraiser, which raised over $7,000. Many early fundraising events were held in gay bars and discos. A fundraiser at Studio One in March 1984, featuring Joan Rivers, raised $45,000 for APLA Health and other new AIDS service organizations.

On July 1985, APLA Health (then AIDS Project Los Angeles) held the world's first AIDS Walk. The Walk is now the largest HIV/AIDS fundraiser in Southern California. Days before the first AIDS Walk, movie star Rock Hudson revealed that he had AIDS, which led to thousands of walkers raising more than $673,000. In response, Elizabeth Taylor helped to spearhead a drive by the entertainment community to confront the disease and created the first Commitment to Life event. The event, held at the Bonaventure Hotel, honored former First Lady Betty Ford and raised $1.3 million.

Programs and Services
In 2013, APLA Health opened its first health center, the Gleicher/Chen Health Center, in the Baldwin Hills neighborhood of Los Angeles. This was followed by the Long Beach Health Center in 2016 and APLA Health – Olympic in 2018. As an FQHC, APLA Health serves those most in need – people who are uninsured, under-insured, or cannot find a care team. In addition, APLA Health supports low-income people with critical HIV Access services. The HIV prevention services are designed to support those communities in Los Angeles County who experience a disproportionate share of new HIV infections; including men who have sex with men (MSM), men of color and transgender women.

APLA Health was a co-sponsor of SB 159 expanding PrEP and PEP access through pharmacies, SB 1021 to prevent price gouging patients.

Summary of Programs and Services
 Primary Care
 HIV Specialty Care
 Dental care
 Mental health services
 Substance abuse counseling
 HIV Prevention Services
 Vance North Necessities of Life Food Pantry
 Housing Support Services
 Care Coordination Services
 Advocacy
 Nutrition Counseling
 Insurance Enrollment
 Benefits Counseling
 Home Health Care
 Health Education
 Community-Based Research

Global HIV/AIDS Advocacy
M-Pact Global Action for Gay Men’s Health and Rights was founded in 2006 at the Toronto International AIDS Conference by an international group of activists – including APLA Health (then AIDS Project Los Angeles) - concerned about the disproportionate HIV disease burden being shouldered by gay and bisexual men and other men who have sex with men (MSM) worldwide. M-Pact’s mission is to advocate for equitable access to effective HIV prevention, care, treatment, and support services for gay men and bisexual men,   including those living with HIV, while promoting their health and human rights worldwide.

Applied research conducted by APLA Health's CBR team addresses topics including: sexual risk and health behaviors; HIV/AIDS treatment education; Medicare policy; substance use; social and cultural factors shaping HIV risk for gay men of color, health disparities, social stigma and discrimination. Study findings are used by APLA Health to develop new services, improve existing ones and highlight trends in the field. APLA Health CBR findings have been presented at local, statewide, national and international levels.

References

External links
 APLA Health

HIV/AIDS organizations in the United States